"Undisclosed Desires" (also known as "Undisclosed") is a song by English rock band Muse. It was released as the second single from their fifth studio album, The Resistance, on 16 November 2009. The song was written by lead vocalist Matthew Bellamy, who has described the song as being "quite a personal song about me and my girlfriend." The song peaked at number 49 on the UK Singles Chart. It also achieved large success in Australia where it was certified Platinum and is Muse's highest-charting single in that country.

Background and composition
In an interview with English music magazine Mojo, songwriter Matthew Bellamy described "Undisclosed Desires" as one of "some tracks [...] that really take an influence from contemporary R&B, and a little bit from the David Bowie Song "Ashes to Ashes" – heavy beats, syncopation, very melodic, rhythmic vocals," adding that "Dom [Howard, Muse drummer] has done all the drum programming. [...] It's the first song we've had where I don't play guitar or piano." NME commented on the lack of guitar and piano, writing that "the song [is] built around electric drum patterns and some slap bass from Chris Wolstenholme." Speaking about his slap bass contribution, Wolstenholme joked that "it's probably not ever been cool to play slap bass, [...] but on that song it just seemed to work so we kept it in." When performed live, Bellamy plays a keytar. Music magazine Q describe the song as having a "minimal and dance-y feel." In the interview with Q, Bellamy also revealed the inspiration behind the song's lyrics, explaining that "it's actually quite a personal song about me and my girlfriend. I'm thinking people have had enough of geo-political stuff by the end of the album." The style of the song has been compared to that of new wave band Depeche Mode, especially their single "New Life".

Release and reception
The song garnered a mixed reception from critics, with some chastising the R&B sound while others thought of it as too much of a departure from their already diverse sound.  Andrew Leahey of music website allmusic described the song as "bizarre Timbaland-meets-Depeche Mode ambiance," using it as an example of the band's apparent "tendency to pile excess upon excess." Reviewing for NME, Ben Patashnik noted "Undisclosed" as evidence of the band "try[ing] to reignite the low-down R&B of ‘Supermassive Black Hole’," which he also suggests "backfires." Patashnik went on to criticize the song further, slating it as sounding like "something Timbaland might find down the back of his mixing desk."  Mojo, on the other hand, identified "Undisclosed" as one of the highlights of The Resistance, along with "United States of Eurasia" and "Uprising". Q Magazine also described it favourably, calling it "a stark, gothic take (on Timbaland's style)". On 19 February 2010, "Undisclosed Desires" finished on the Hot30 Countdown at a peak of number 9.

Music video
The video, directed by French duo Jonas & François, depicts all 3 members of Muse in a rather unusual room where there are wires lying and hanging everywhere. Chris is playing slap bass in the corner next to a massive hamster wheel filled with bass guitars; Dom is alternating playing the drum kit and pushing more drums into the kit; and Matt is at the front, playing keytar and singing into two microphones taped together, with three glass frames in front of him labelled "Matt Close up", "Matt Mid shot" and "Matt Long shot", and a small area above him with eight microphones surrounding it, where he occasionally puts his hand in to snap his fingers. There is also a dancer dressed in extravagantly bright colours performing various dance moves. In addition, there are at least thirty monitors on the walls, showing the lyrics word-by-word, all seem to be out of sync except two or three, but they are all right in sync chorus. At the beginning of the video Matt plugs a wire into his shoe. Sometimes a bleeding heart is seen in front of a white background.

Track listing

Personnel
Muse
Matthew Bellamy – lead vocals, keyboards, synthesizers, programming, production
Christopher Wolstenholme – bass, backing vocals, production
Dominic Howard – drums, synthesizers, programming, production
Main production personnel
Adrian Bushby – engineering
Mark "Spike" Stent – mixing
Ted Jensen – mastering

Charts

Weekly charts

Year-end charts

Certifications

References

External links
Official
 "Undisclosed Desires" 30-second audio sample

Muse (band) songs
2009 singles
Songs written by Matt Bellamy
2009 songs
Warner Records singles